Vizneh (Persian: ویزنه, Roosta-e-Vīzne, also Latinized as Vizneh) is a village in Chubar Rural District, Haviq District, Talesh County, Gilan Province, Iran.It is the largest village in Talesh County which At the 2016 census, its population was 3,022, in 877 families.

References 
3. census of the Islamic Republic of Iran,1395(2016) Excel of Guilan County 

Populated places in Talesh County